Anam Goher is a Pakistani television actress. She made her acting debut along with her off screen husband Goher Mumtaz in Kathputli (2016).

Personal life
Anma Goher is married to Gohar Mumtaz.

Career
Goher is known for her roles in many serials including Yeh Ishq (2016), Yeh Raha Dil (2017) and Aakhri Station (2018) and Khaas (2019). She was last seen playing a role of Nida Saud in Hum TV's Khaas.

Film

Television

References

External links

Living people
1989 births